Stephen Paul Slivinski (August 23, 1917 – November 15, 2008) was an American football guard in the National Football League (NFL) for the Washington Redskins.  He played college football at the University of Washington and was drafted in the thirteenth round of the 1939 NFL Draft.

Slivinski returned to Washington as a coach in 1945.

References

External links

1917 births
2008 deaths
American football guards
Players of American football from Chicago
Washington Huskies football players
Washington Huskies football coaches
Washington Redskins players